Tamara Potocká (born 15 August 2002) is a Slovak swimmer. She competed in the women's 50 metre butterfly event at the 2018 FINA World Swimming Championships (25 m), in Hangzhou, China.

References

2002 births
Living people
Slovak female swimmers
Female butterfly swimmers
Place of birth missing (living people)
Swimmers at the 2018 Summer Youth Olympics
21st-century Slovak women